German submarine U-928 was a Type VIIC U-boat of Nazi Germany's Kriegsmarine during World War II.

She was ordered on 25 August 1941, and was laid down on 5 January 1943 at Neptun Werft AG, Rostock, as yard number 515. She was launched on 15 April 1944 and commissioned under the command of Oberleutnant zur See Hellmut Stähler on 11 July 1944.

Design
German Type VIIC submarines were preceded by the shorter Type VIIB submarines. U-928 had a displacement of  when at the surface and  while submerged. She had two shafts and two  propellers.

U-928 was fitted with five  torpedo tubes (four fitted at the bow and one at the stern), fourteen torpedoes or 26 TMA mines, one  SK C/35 naval gun, (220 rounds), one  Flak M42 and two twin  C/30 anti-aircraft guns. The boat had a complement of between 44 — 52 men.

Service history
On 9 May 1945, U-928 surrendered at Bergen, Norway. She was later transferred to Lisahally, Northern Ireland on 30 May 1945. Of the 156 U-boats that eventually surrendered to the Allied forces at the end of the war, U-928 was one of 116 selected to take part in Operation Deadlight. U-928 was towed out on 16 December 1945, and sunk.

References

Bibliography

External links

German Type VIIC submarines
U-boats commissioned in 1944
World War II submarines of Germany
Ships built in Rostock
1944 ships
Maritime incidents in December 1945
World War II shipwrecks in the Atlantic Ocean
Operation Deadlight